Notapictinus is a genus of flat bugs in the family Aradidae. There are about 12 described species in Notapictinus.

Species
These 12 species belong to the genus Notapictinus:

 Notapictinus aurivillii (Bergroth, 1887)
 Notapictinus dominicus (Usinger, 1936)
 Notapictinus martinezi Kormilev, 1953
 Notapictinus micropterus Kormilev
 Notapictinus ornatus Kormilev
 Notapictinus paramaculatus Kormilev
 Notapictinus parvulus Kormilev
 Notapictinus platyceps Kormilev
 Notapictinus plaumani Kormilev
 Notapictinus sanmigueli Kormilev, 1959
 Notapictinus terminalis Kormilev
 Notapictinus uruguayensis Kormilev

References

Aradidae
Articles created by Qbugbot
Pentatomomorpha genera